Rose Bowl is a 1936 American comedy film directed by Charles Barton and written by Marguerite Roberts. The film stars Eleanore Whitney, Tom Brown, Buster Crabbe, William Frawley, Benny Baker and Nydia Westman. The film was released on October 30, 1936, by Paramount Pictures.

Plot

"Cheers" Reynolds has a pair of suitors, Paddy O'Riley and Ossie Merrill, both football stars. As the boys leave their hometown for separate colleges, Cheers makes it clear Ossie is the one she prefers.

Ossie neglects writing to her, and when Paddy returns to town, his friend and teammate Dutch Schultz tries to let Cheers know how much Paddy misses her. Dutch himself falls for a newspaper reporter, Florence Taylor.

When their school, Green Ridge, gets invited to play in the Rose Bowl football game, Paddy and Dutch look forward to playing against Ossie's team. The coach, Soapy Moreland, catches his star player Paddy in a room after curfew with Cheers and suspends him from the game. But he has a change of heart, Green Ridge wins and Cheers comes to the locker room to tell Paddy he's her guy.

Cast 
Eleanore Whitney as Cheers Reynolds
Tom Brown as Paddy O'Riley
Buster Crabbe as Ossie Merrill
William Frawley as Soapy Moreland
Benny Baker as Dutch Schultz
Nydia Westman as Susie Reynolds
Nick Lukats as Donovan
Priscilla Lawson as Florence Taylor
Adrian Morris as Doc
Jimmy Conlin as Browning Hills 
Louis Mason as Thornton
Ellen Drew as Mary Arnold

References

External links 
 

1936 films
1930s English-language films
Paramount Pictures films
American crime comedy films
Films directed by Charles Barton
American black-and-white films
1930s crime comedy films
1936 comedy films
1930s American films